Trebenče is a village north of Cerkno in the traditional Littoral region of Slovenia.

Church
The local church is dedicated to Saint Josse and belongs to the Parish of Cerkno. The church stands on a rocky rise northwest of Trebenče. It was originally a Gothic structure that was remodeled in the Baroque style. The presbytery and nave preserve paintings believed to date from the 16th century. There is a wooden Baroque altar against the south wall of the nave.

Other cultural heritage
In addition to the church, a number of other structures in Trebenče have official cultural heritage status:
The farm at Trebenče no. 4 stands in a cluster of other farms and houses in the village, above the main road and southeast of the Church of Saint Josse. The rectangular house has a gabled roof and decorated plaster on its facade. There is also a granary under the same roof. The farm also includes a stall and a barn, and was renovated in 1947.
The Gradišče archaeological site is an unexplored potential site. It is the location of a prehistoric fort. There is a folk tradition of a structure at the site and a gilded clay pot was found there.
A closed chapel-shrine stands on a rocky outcrop alongside the bridge east of the house at Trenenče no. 15. It is a stone structure with a gabled metal roof shaped to accommodate a triangular cornice on the front side. The top of the roof is ornamented by a stone orb and a metal cross. The sides are decorated with pilasters, and the door casing and windows are rounded at the top.
There is a Partisan memorial at the crossroads in the northwest part of the village. It is a rectangular stone structure with a stone plaque on the front commemorating Partisan institutions and units that functioned in Trebenče during the Second World War. It was installed on 12 May 1985.

References

External links

Trebenče at Geopedia

Populated places in the Municipality of Cerkno